Sirens is the third independent EP by Melbourne acoustic folk band Woodlock.

The album was recorded in 2015 with producer Andy Mak, and supported by a national tour, as well as four festival appearances.

The album charted on the ARIA Independent Charts, while the title track also charted on the ARIA Singles Charts.

Woodlock has described the title track as a 'coming of age' song. "It’s almost a baptism from being the teenagers busking the streets, to the adults who really believe they have something to offer the world. Overall its about standing firm for what you believe, and not swaying on it."

Track listing

Personnel

Woodlock
Eze Walters – vocals, acoustic guitar, electric guitar, organ, wurlitzer, production (on Eleanor)
Zech Walters – background vocals, synth, piano, organ, acoustic guitar, electric guitar, bass, production (on Eleanor)
Bowen Purcell – percussion, drums

Additional personnel
Josh Telford - Mixing, additional recording
Matthew Gray - Mastering (Matthew Gray Mastering)
Andy Mak - Production, programming, synths, bass, percussion

Charting singles

Release history

References

2015 EPs
Woodlock albums
Self-released EPs